National Highway 148A (NH 148A) is a National Highway of India that starts at Delhi and terminates at Gurgaon connecting through states of India. NH 148A passes through the states of Delhi and Haryana.

Its stretch from Delhi to Mumbai was earlier designated NH 8 and the stretch between Mumbai and Gurgaon was designated NH 4 before all the national highways were renumbered in the year 2010.

Route 
The NH 148A passes through these important cities and towns that are given below:
 Delhi
 Gurgaon

See also 
 List of National Highways in India
 List of National Highways in India by state
 National Highways Development Project
 National Highway 169 (India)
 National Highway 66 (India)

References

External links 
 NH 148A on OpenStreetMap

National highways in India
National Highways in Delhi
National Highways in Haryana